Elections to Bromley Council were held on 4 May 2006.  The whole council was up for election and the council was held by the Conservatives, with their net gains putting them in their best state for over twenty years.

After the election, the composition of the council was
Conservative 49
Liberal Democrat 7
Labour 4

Election result

Ward results

Bickley

Biggin Hill

Bromley Common and Keston

Bromley Town

Chelsfield and Pratts Bottom

Chislehurst

Clock House

Copers Cope

Cray Valley East

Cray Valley West

Crystal Palace

Darwin

Farnborough and Crofton

Hayes and Coney Hall

Kelsey and Eden Park

Mottingham and Chislehurst North

Orpington

Penge and Cator

Petts Wood and Knoll

Plaistow and Sundridge

Shortlands

West Wickham

References

Bromley